Ceroplesis bicincta is a species of beetle in the family Cerambycidae. It was described by Johan Christian Fabricius in 1798. It is known from the Democratic Republic of the Congo, Angola, Namibia, Tanzania, and South Africa. The species contains the variety Ceroplesis bicincta var. centralis. It feeds off of Theobroma cacao.

References

bicincta
Beetles described in 1798